Hillary Hawkins is an American actress. She introduced shows such as Dora the Explorer, Bob the Builder, and Little Bill on TV everyday as Robyn, Host of the Nick Jr. block. She also was a Host for Radio Disney.

Career

Early roles
As a child actress, she played Kate on an episode of Nickelodeon's Are You Afraid of the Dark? ("The Tale of the Jagged Sign"), the singing voice of Vanessa on Nickelodeon's Gullah Gullah Island and Keisha on New York Undercover. Hillary also was Jennifer in a series of Eikaiwa Challenge videos by Berlitz in Japan.

2000s
Hillary Hawkins was the host of Nick Jr. After introducing shows such as Dora the Explorer, Bob the Builder and Little Bill on TV everyday as Robyn, Host of Nick Jr., Hillary became a Host for Radio Disney.

2010s
Hillary is an actress, screenwriter, producer of Stuck For a Reason, aired on ABC, CBS, NBC and FOX on African American Short Films. She is also actress, screenwriter, producer of A Pill for Two and winner Best Actress Award in a Drama.  
The film is based on Hawkins' full-length play Jaded The Musical which was produced at The Secret Theatre in 2013 and developed at Scratch Night at Theatre for the New City in 2012. In addition to being playwright, lyricist, composer of Jaded The Musical, Hillary is playwright of Sherri, developed in the Women's Work Project, produced by New Perspectives Theatre Company.

Hillary Hawkins is a voice actress that has been nominated for 3 Voice Arts Awards: Outstanding Audiobook Narration – Teens (2014), Metaphysical Best Voiceover (2015) and Author Performance, Best Voiceover (2018.) From 2013 to 2018, Hillary narrated over 100 audiobooks including Your Word Is Your Wand and The Game of Life and How to Play It by Florence Scovel Shinn, Creative Mind and Creative Mind And Success by Ernest Holmes and Feeling is the Secret and At Your Command by Neville Goddard. She also narrated several books of the Bible.

On August 26, 2017, Hillary voiced Annia Antoninus on the conceptual album 20s A Difficult Age by Marcus Orelias.  
In 2017, Ronimo Games released Awesomenauts Soundtrack – Dizzy Character Theme with vocals by Hillary Hawkins. 
Voice Actress Hillary performed numerous voiceovers for clients such as Lego, Disney, Make-A-Wish Foundation, Scholastic, ADRA, DCCC, American Red Cross and UNICEF.

In addition to being an actress, Hillary Hawkins is a female martial artist with a black belt in Karate. Actress Martial Artist Hillary Hawkins is the female martial artist in the black karate gi with a black belt striking in the 2017 Star Wars Target Commercial.

In 2018, Hillary worked as an ADR Voice Match on the film Acrimony directed by Tyler Perry.

On January 18, 2019, Hillary Hawkins released The Case Files. Hawkins who is the creator, animation writer, director, producer, artist, animator and voice actress for the animated drama series refers to the show as a "Child Protective Series." Hawkins previously worked in Child Protective Services, like the animated character she created named Hope.

On February 7, 2019, Hillary Hawkins released Heart2Heart, an American animated series and cartoon music group that sings children's songs, jazz songs and love songs. Hillary Hawkins is creator, singer, songwriter, composer, director, voice actress, artist and producer of the cartoon musical.

2020s
In 2020, in addition to continuing her work as an international voice actor and New Thought narrator of spiritual self-development books such as Science of Mind, New Thought Theatre, Morning & Evening Thoughts for the Soul, 31 Days of Wisdom and From Passion to Peace, actress singer songwriter Hillary Hawkins released new music and music videos.

April 8, 2020, "Focus on the Good Things" by Christian Music Artist Hillary Hawkins was released as a music video.

April 17, 2020, "Protect" by Christian Singer Songwriter Hillary Hawkins was released as a music video.

April 28, 2020, Hillary Hawkins who was previously on air talent for WEIB 106.3 Smooth FM released an album Sweet Dreams. The album, which includes songs such as "Protect", "Good Sleep Tonight" & "Your Love Is" has been called "easy listening", "soothing", "meditation".

May 12, 2020, the singer songwriter released a music video for "I Picked You", a song from her previous album "Unrequited Love."

May 15, 2020, Hawkins released another music video "Through The River", a jazz and blues song on the album. "Through The River" song was created by Anthony J. Dixon (creator of "Futurology the Musical") & actress singer songwriter Hillary Hawkins who previously starred in "Futurology" Off-Broadway.

May 29, 2020, female Rapper Hillary Hawkins released a single "Where Are The True Christians?”

June 4, 2020, female rapper Hillary Hawkins released music video and single "Black Lives Matter".

September 1, 2020 Christian Hip Hop Artist Hillary Hawkins released "Love Back In Your Heart."

September 3, 2020 Hillary Hawkins released Love Lessons 101 a Christian Hip Hop Album. She is singer, rapper, songwriter of all songs on the album.

Education 
Hillary attended Professional Children's School and has a Dual BA in Spanish & Creative Writing from Smith College.

Filmography

Film work

Television work

Video games

Musical theater

National tours
Seussical The Musical – Sour Kangaroo, Young Kangaroo
If You Give A Mouse A Cookie & Other Story Books – Grace, Borreguita

Audiobooks

Self-development
As a Woman Thinketh – Narrator
At Your Command – Narrator
Creative Mind – Narrator
Creative Mind and Success – Narrator
Feeling Is the Secret – Narrator
How to Live Life and Love It – Narrator
New Thought Theatre – Narrator
Oprah – Narrator
Out of This World – Narrator
Science of Mind – Narrator
The Game of Life and How to Play It – Narrator
The Secret Door to Success – Narrator
Your Heart's Desire – Narrator
Your Word Is Your Wand – Narrator

Religion and spirituality
31 Daily Affirmations Based On The Word of God – To Speak Over Your Life! – Narrator
31 Motivational Bible Verses! (31 Bible Verses By Subject Series) – Narrator
31 Powerful Prayers Guaranteed To Make Tremendous Power Available and Avail Much – Narrator
31 Powerful Prayers Of Thanksgiving – Guaranteed To Always Cause You To Triumph! – Narrator
Bible Script for Life: Combat Depression with Jesus – Narrator
Sermons from Hillary & The Holy Spirit: Make Friends With God – Narrator
Sermons from Hillary & The Holy Spirit: Love Thy Neighbor – Narrator
The Book of 1 John – King James Version – Narrator
The Book of Proverbs – King James Version – Narrator
The Book of Psalms – King James Version – Narrator
The Book of Revelation – King James Version – Narrator

Kids
Craig Meets Dave: And Learns About Autism, Bullying and Friendship – Narrator
If I Were Oprah Winfrey: Little Nia's Dream – Narrator
If I Were President Barack Obama: Little Hunter's Dream – Narrator
June Peters, You Will Change The World One Day – Narrator
Niños Cantando Por Jesus – Narrator
Niños Cantando Por Jesus: Preparando a los Niños para Alabar y Adorar, Libro 2 – Narrator
Special Ed Series Book 1 Meet Special Ed: Special Needs, Disabilities, Special Education – Narrator
Special Ed First Day Of School Book 2: Autism, Blindness – Narrator
Special Ed First Day Of School Book 3: Deafness, Down Syndrome, Epilepsy – Narrator
Special Ed First Day of School Book 4: Diabetes, Dyslexia, Spina Bifida – Narrator
Special Ed First Day Of School Book 5: Cerebral Palsy, Aphasia, ADHD, ADD, Special Needs, Special Education, Disabilities – Narrator
Special People Special Ways – Narrator
The Eighth Birthday Wish – Narrator
Watoto Wakimuimbia Yesu: Kuwaandaa Watoto Kusifu Na Kuabudu (Swahili Edition) – Narrator
Watoto Wakimuimbia Yesu: Kuwaandaa Watoto Kusifu Na Kuabudu, Kitabu cha 2 – Narrator

Awards and nominations

References

External links

Hillary Hawkins on iTunes
Hillary Hawkins on Audible
From Children's Films to Social Issue – YourTodayNews.com
Nickelodeon Star Hillary Hawkins to Appear in Secret Theatre's JADED THE MUSICAL
Nick Jr.'s Hawkins Joins 12/10 Ludlow Ladd Concert
Audiobooks Narrated by Hillary Hawkins

Living people
21st-century African-American people
21st-century African-American women
Actresses from New Jersey
African-American actresses
African-American television personalities
American child actresses
American Christians

American film actresses
American stage actresses
American television actresses
American television hosts
American voice actresses
American women television presenters
Place of birth missing (living people)
Year of birth missing (living people)